Derek Anthony Perera (born 13 October 1977) is a Canadian former cricketer of Sri Lankan origin. He has played for Canadian cricket team at the 1997 ICC Trophy.

Perera played in a single first-class cricket match for Nondescripts Cricket Club before moving to Canada. He is currently coaching the Canadian U19 cricket team and also assisted the national cricket team to qualify for the 2007 ICC Cricket World Cup. In 2016, he was named and recognised as one of the greatest head coaches in the North American region by the ICC.

References

External links 
 

1977 births
Living people
Canadian cricketers
Sri Lankan cricketers
Nondescripts Cricket Club cricketers
Canadian people of Sri Lankan descent
Sri Lankan expatriates in Canada
Canadian cricket coaches
Coaches of the Canada national cricket team
Sportspeople from Brampton